The 2000–01 Duke Blue Devils men's basketball team represented Duke University during the 2000–01 NCAA Division I men's basketball season,  and were coached by 21st-year head coach Mike Krzyzewski.

Duke won the 2001 Atlantic Coast Conference tournament and defeated Monmouth, Missouri, UCLA, USC, Maryland, and Arizona to win their third national championship in Duke's history, under the leadership of All-American duo Shane Battier and Jason "Jay" Williams.

Roster

Expectations
Shane Battier entered his senior season as the remaining member of Duke's heralded recruiting class of 1997 which included Elton Brand and William Avery and had nearly led Duke to a championship two years earlier. (Brand and Avery, along with Corey Maggette would become the first Duke underclassmen to leave early for the draft that year.) Despite losing the reigning ACC Player of the Year Chris Carrawell to graduation, the Blue Devils still retained sophomores Jason Williams, Mike Dunleavy, Jr., and Carlos Boozer and welcomed the addition of freshman Chris Duhon to their lineup.

Regular season
On January 27, 2001, the #2 Duke Blue Devils played at #8 Maryland Terrapins in what would become the first of four contests between these two ACC powerhouses. With Duke trailing by 10 points, with 54 seconds left in regulation, Williams scored eight points. These points included two 3 pointers in a 13 second span. James hit two free throws to send this game into overtime. In overtime, Battier blocked a layup by Juan Dixon at the baseline with 4 seconds left to preserve a 98 to 96 victory.

However, the Blue Devils stumbled in the next game at home against their rival, 4th ranked North Carolina by a score of 85 to 83. A month later, Maryland would avenge their home loss to Duke when the No. 16 Terrapins defeated the No. 2 Blue Devils 91 to 80 on Shane Battier's Senior Night in Cameron Indoor Stadium. After center Carlos Boozer had to leave with a foot injury in that game, Coach Krzyzewski decided to change his strategy, favoring a smaller, quicker lineup by having Duhon start at point guard and moving Williams over to shooting guard. His plan was successful in Duke's next game at North Carolina, when Duke defeated the No. 4 Tar Heels 95 to 81 to claim a share of the regular season championship.  The Blue Devils  went on to win 6 of its games following Boozer's injury. Then Boozer rejoined the team in the Sweet Sixteen of the NCAA Tournament.

Conference tournament
Duke finished the regular season with a 26–4 record entering the ACC tournament as a No. 2 seed. In the tournament semifinals, they met Maryland for the third time this season. In another thrilling contest, after Maryland had rallied from a 14 point, second-half deficit, the Blue Devils defeated the Terrapins 84 to 82 when Nate James tipped in the game-winner with 1.3 seconds left to advance to the title game against North Carolina. In the third game between Duke and UNC that season, the Blue Devils emerged victorious as ACC tournament champions by the score of 79 to 53 and received a No. 1 seed in the East Regional of the NCAA tournament.

NCAA tournament
The Blue Devils would travel the same path they took nine years ago when they claimed their last championship in 1992, from Greensboro to Philadelphia to Minneapolis, where they met Maryland for the fourth time that season, this time in the Final Four with a berth in the championship game at stake. Finding themselves down 17 to 39 with 6:57 to play in the first half and down 38 to 49 at Halftime, Duke went on to stage a comeback against the Terrapins and win 95–84 to advance to the championship game. Duke's 22-point deficit and 11-point Halftime deficit marked the largest comeback in Final Four history.

Facing fifth-ranked Arizona led by Gilbert Arenas and Richard Jefferson and coached by Lute Olson, who had lost his wife to cancer earlier during the season, Duke was able to stave off a comeback attempt in the second half and clinch the title by a final score of 82–72. With his third national championship, coach Mike Krzyzewski tied his mentor Bob Knight for third place behind Adolph Rupp (4) and John Wooden (10). Battier was named the NCAA basketball tournament Most Outstanding Player.

2000–01 schedule and results

|-
!colspan=9 style=| Regular season

|-
!colspan=9 style=| ACC tournament

|-
!colspan=9 style=| NCAA tournament

Rankings

*AP does not release post-NCAA Tournament rankings^Coaches did not release a week 2 poll

Accomplishments
3rd national championship in school history (1991, 1992, 2001)
2nd appearance in national championship game in three years (1999, 2001)
3rd straight No. 1-ranking in final regular season AP poll, and 1st No. 1-ranked team to win the national championship since UCLA in 1995.
Duke set an NCAA record by winning its 133rd game over a four-year period. The Blue Devils (133–15) broke the record set by Kentucky from 1995–96 and 1998–99.
Duke is the first team to be seeded No. 1 over four consecutive seasons since the NCAA began seeding teams in 1979.
Duke swept all the major National Player of the Year Awards:
Jason Williams was named the NABC Player of the Year.
Shane Battier claimed the AP National Player of the Year, Oscar Robertson Trophy, Wooden Award, Naismith Award, and Adolph Rupp Trophy awards.
Shane Battier won the NABC Defensive Player of the Year award for the third straight time.
Shane Battier tied an NCAA record for victories (131) for a four-year period set by Kentucky's Wayne Turner.
Jason Williams set a Duke single-season scoring record with 841 points, previously held by Dick Groat (831) in 1951.
Shane Battier and Jason Williams were consensus All-American First Team selections.
Shane Battier was an Academic All-American First Team selection for the 2nd straight year.
Three players received All-ACC honors:
Shane Battier, Jason Williams (1st Team)
Nate James (3rd Team)
Two players from the 2001 squad (Battier and Jason Williams) had their jerseys retired by Duke.
Duke set records with the most three-pointers made (407) and attempted (1,057) in a single season by a college basketball team.

References

External links
 Duke Blue Devils Basketball Statistical Database

 

Duke Blue Devils
Duke Blue Devils men's basketball seasons
NCAA Division I men's basketball tournament Final Four seasons
NCAA Division I men's basketball tournament championship seasons
Duke
Duke
Duke